Charles Edward Hamilton (1844 – 25 May 1919) was a Canadian politician serving as a member of the Legislative Assembly of Manitoba and as the seventh Mayor of Winnipeg in 1885.

Born in Rochester, England, Hamilton emigrated to Canada before studying law. Hamilton married Alma Lizzie Ashworth of Ottawa. After moving from St. Catharines, Ontario to Winnipeg in 1881, he established a law practice. In the 1884 city election, he won the contest for mayor as a citizen's candidate.

On 24 February 1885, Hamilton won a provincial by-election in the Winnipeg South riding for the Conservative party. In the 1886 provincial election, he won the Shoal Lake riding.

Hamilton left provincial politics and in 1888 moved to Saint Paul, Minnesota where he became Vice-President of the Pacific and Oriental Investment Company in 1897, as well as serving as the British Vice-Consul for Minnesota. Hamilton died in 1919.

Hamilton's son, Charles Ashworth Hamilton, was the founder of Hamilton's Stores in Yellowstone National Park.

Hamilton Avenue in Winnipeg is named in C.E. Hamilton's honour.

References

1844 births
1919 deaths
Manitoba Liberal Party MLAs
Mayors of Winnipeg
English emigrants to Canada
Lawyers in Manitoba
People from Rochester, Kent
Members of the Executive Council of Manitoba